Kang Hyeon (born 30 January 1998) is a South Korean footballer who currently plays as a midfielder for Yeoju.

Career statistics

Club

References

1998 births
Living people
South Korean footballers
South Korean expatriate footballers
Association football midfielders
2. Liga (Austria) players
Kapfenberger SV players
South Korean expatriate sportspeople in Austria
Expatriate footballers in Austria
South Korean expatriate sportspeople in Croatia
Expatriate footballers in Croatia
South Korean expatriate sportspeople in Thailand
Expatriate footballers in Thailand